The Classic Rock series of albums are a collection of classical crossover records by the London Symphony Orchestra and the Royal Choral Society, consisting of orchestral/choral arrangements of pop/rock songs. They began with a concert at the Royal Albert Hall in London. The first album in the series was released in 1978 with the release of Classic Rock on K-tel Records. The album was recorded at Abbey Road Studios and produced by Jeff Jarratt & Don Reedman.

See also
Hooked on Classics series

References

Album series
K-tel albums
Portrait Records albums
Horizon Records albums
London Symphony Orchestra albums
Classical crossover albums